Michéal Castaldo (born September 25, 1962) is an Italian-born classical crossover tenor, music producer and composer.

Early life and musical career
Castaldo started his voice studies with maestro Pisapia, a protégé of the Italian operatic tenor Enrico Caruso. Castaldo graduated from Oakwood Collegiate Institute in Toronto and Berklee College of Music in Boston (1986).

In 1989, Castaldo was named an Abe Olman Scholarship Award recipient by the Songwriters Hall of Fame. Castaldo wrote and produced "Goin' Krazy" which was released by José Feliciano 1994, which entered the Billboard dance chart.

Castaldo has recorded six solo studio albums. His third album Aceto was released in 2010. The album includes 14 classic and 2 original Italian songs. He recorded an Italian version of "Hallelujah" on the album. A video of the song was filmed in Toronto, Ontario, Canada, in December 2010 by filmmaker Greg Riccio Jr. supporting the Free Hugs Campaign to promote random acts of kindness.

In 2011, "Pray'r", an original song co-written with Stein Berge Svendsen, was released as a digi-single. Castaldo released an Italian album in 2012. Since 2011, he has been touring Italy, the US and Canada. Castaldo performed his theatrical debut on May 15, 2011, at the Hearst Auditorium concert stage, which is part of Chaminade High School Athletic and Activity Center in Mineola, New York .

In 2012, Castaldo was a competitor in The Europe Tourism Board classical-crossover artist award. Out of 37 submitted artists, he finished third.

Castaldo was featured live on ABC TV for his performance on the Red Carpet during the 68th Annual New York Columbus Day parade 2012.

In 2013, Castaldo's Bergamot Tour included 48 performances, and in 2014, there have been 21 tour dates by midyear, including a performance at Teatro F. Cilea Reggio, in Reggio Calabria, Italy for the fifth annual Mino Reitano memorial concert.

In March 2014, he won the Top Artist award in the monthly contest held by ArtistSignal.com (by a record-breaking total number of 92,488 votes by 1338 voters). The Artist Signal top artist is awarded US$10,000 to help them promote their music and career.

In January 2015, he released an EP with classical-crossover soprano Giorgia Fumanti, called "A Christmas Pray'r".

In May 2015, Castaldo released a digi single, "Everything Happens for a Reason—Una Ragione." The song will have over 30 lyric videos, many of which have subtitles in various languages, including Persian, Spanish, Afrikaans, Polish, Japanese, German, Hebrew, Norwegian, Czech, Portuguese, Hindi, French, Turkish, Chinese, Swedish, Russian, Romanian, Serbian, and Danish. A remastered version of the song was later released in August 2015.

Personal life
Castaldo is married to Bozena S. Castaldo (née Bozena S. Slowinska), who is a published scientist (Neurology Department) at Weill Cornell Medical College in New York. His stepdaughter, Ania Palega (née Ania Slowinska) is a graduate from CUNY with a PhD in Environmental Psychology.

Discography

Solo albums
 2004: Villa

 2007: La Dolce Vita 'NAmerica
 2010: Aceto

 2011: Extravergine
 2012: Olive You
 2013: Bergamot
 2017: Cinecittà Canta

Studio albums with Lives of a Cell
 1994: Only Human
 2002: Gioia2

Singles
 2010: "Io Credo"
 2011: "L'arcobaleno"
 2011: "Pray'r"
 2013: "Calabrisella Mia"
 2014: "A Christmas Pray'r" (duet with Giorgia Fumanti)
 2015: "Toglimi Il Respiro (Take My Breath Away)"
 2015: "Everything Happens for a Reason—Una Ragione"
 2015: "Everything Happens for a Reason (Remastered)"
 2015: "Amo L’America—American Love Affair"
 2016: "Temptation Down In Rio"
 2016: "O Come O come Emmanuel"
 2016: "Everything Happens for a Reason—Dance Remix by Tony Moran"
 2016: "Caruso" remix by Tony Moran
 2017: "Il Mio Cuore Va (My Heart Will Go On)"
 2017: "Africa"
 2019: "Baila Morena"
 2019: "Maria, Lo Sapevi Tu?"
 2022: "Hotel California" [Remix]
 2022: "Riu"
 2022: "Na Muri"
 2022: "Spetu Pe Tia"

References

External links
 Official website
 Selected recordings and live performances on YouTube
 Page at Classical-Crossover

1962 births
Living people
Italian male singers
Italian tenors
Opera crossover singers
Italian emigrants to Canada
Italian singer-songwriters